George Alderson Quin (22 January 1914 – 5 August 1990) was the third Bishop of Down and Dromore.

Educated at Trinity College, Dublin and ordained in 1938, his first post was a curacy at  St Jude, Ballynafeigh, Belfast. He was then Dean’s Vicar of St Anne’s Cathedral, Belfast. After further incumbencies at Holywood, Magheralin and Ballymacarrett he became Archdeacon of Down in 1956. Fourteen years later he was appointed to the episcopate, serving for a decade – he was elected Bishop of Down and Dromore 26 November 1969 and consecrated 6 January 1970; he resigned on 31 March 1980.

References

1914 births
Alumni of Trinity College Dublin
Archdeacons of Down
20th-century Anglican bishops in Ireland
Bishops of Down and Dromore
1990 deaths